Al-Muharrar al-Wajiz fi Tafsir al-Kitāb al-'Aziz or shortly named al-Muharrar al-Wajiz, better known as Tafsir Ibn 'Atiyya, is a classical Sunni tafsir of the Qur'an, authored by the Maliki-Ash'ari scholar Ibn 'Atiyya (d. 541/1147).

It can be identified as the exegesis that amalgamates Tafsir bi al-Ma'thur (tradition-based interpretation) with Tafsir bi al-Ra'y (reason-based interpretation). But, generally, it is considered as Tafsir bi al-Ma'thur (interpretation based on traditions or reports).

Methodology 
Ibn 'Atiyya explains his methodology stating: “I move in this commentary according to the word order of every verse, explaining its ruling, grammatical position, linguistic function, meaning and pronunciation in different methods of recitation.”

In the opening pages Ibn 'Atiyya sets forth his purpose in coming out with a new commentary: to produce a comprehensive, yet concise work, dedicated to God, which would affirm the statements made by earlier scholars, as well as those made by al-Salaf al-Salih, and which would serve as a defense against the mulhidin (atheists, agnostics, heretics, the disbelievers in God), those who reject the Islamic message, and the adherents of esoteric doctrines (ahl al-'ilm al-batin).

The introduction to his Qur'an commentary was published by Arthur Jeffery (1954).

Background 
Ibn 'Atiyya relied on several earlier sources for his interpretation, including the following:
 Jami' al-Bayan fi Ta'wil al-Qur'an by Abu Ja'far Muhammad ibn Jarir al-Tabari (d. 310/923).
 Shifa' al-Sudur by Abu Bakr Muhammad b. al-Hasan al-Naqqash (d. 351/962 ).
 Al-Hidaya ila Bulugh al-Nihaya by Makki b. Abi Talib al-Qaysi (d. 437/1045).
 Al-Tahsil li-Fawa'id al-Tafsil by Abu al-'Abbas Ahmad b. 'Ammar al-Mahdawi (d. 430/1038).

Reception 
Ibn 'Atiyya's commentary was very influential on Qur'anic commentators in later generations. His influence is clearly evident in the works of al-Qurtubi (d. 671/1272–3), Abu Hayyan al-Gharnati (d. 745/1344), and 'Abd al-Rahman al-Tha'alibi (d. 875/1470).

Al-Muharrar al-Wajiz was highly acclaimed both in and outside of Spain. The book has been highly praised by Abu Hayyan al-Gharnati (d. 745/1344) and Ibn Khaldun (d. 808/1406).

Ibn Khaldun describes Ibn 'Atiyya's effort as: “He summed up all Qur'anic commentaries and endeavored to include only the most accurate.”

Recent historians writing in the Arabic language, especially those from the Maghreb, have often chosen Ibn Atiyya's exegesis as representative of what may be called the “typical” Andalusian tafsir, and regard its somewhat contradictory title as a useful illustration of the major contribution made by its genre to the field of 'ilm al-Qur'an (Knowledge of the Qur'an with its meanings). According to this view each major Andalusian exegesis can be said to be muharrar, in that the approach used in discussing Qur'anic verses is comprehensive and not exclusively tied to a single method.

Claude Gilliot characterizes al-Muharrar as an abridgement of previous works.

About the author 
Ibn 'Atiyya was the major Qur'an commentator of the generation of al-Wahidi al-Nisaburi (d. 468/1075) and his tafsir work was a turning point in the history of the genre in Andalusia and North Africa.

He was a scholar of tafsir and fiqh from Granada, Al-Andalus (present-day Spain). He studied also Hadith, language and literature. He was appointed as the Qadi (judge) of Almeria during the reign of the Almoravid empire.

See also 
 List of tafsir works
 List of Sunni books

References

External links 
 Tafsir Ibn 'Atiyya - Altafsir.com 
 Tafsir Ibn 'Atiyya - Moroccan Minister of Religious Endowments and Islamic Affairs 
 TAFSIR IBN ‘ATHIYYAH: Al Muharrar Al Wajiiz fii Tafsiir Al Kitaab Al ‘Aziiz 

Ibn Atiyya